The New-Slain Knight is Child ballad number 263.

Synopsis
A man tells a woman that he has seen a knight murdered outside her father's garden.  She insists on a description and laments that she has no father for her baby.  He offers to take her love's place, and she refuses.  He pulls off his disguise and reveals himself as her love, and assures him that now he knows her love is true.

See also
The Bailiff's Daughter of Islington
The Nut-Brown Maid

External links
The New-Slain Knight

Child Ballads
Year of song unknown